Shatalovo is an air base in Pochinok, Pochinkovsky District, Smolensk Oblast of the Russian Air Force as part of the 6th Air and Air Defence Forces Army, Western Military District.

The base is also known as Pochinok, Satalovo, and Shatoalovo. It is a large hardened air base with pads for 19 bombers and 15 fighters in addition to a small amount of tarmac space.  It is a nuclear bomber base (Su-24) according to a Natural Resources Defense Council study.  During the 1980s it was one of 17 airfields hosting the Soviet Union's tactical reconnaissance aircraft regiments.  The normal complement at the air base in 1984 consisted of 9 to 13 each of the Sukhoi Su-24M and Mikoyan-Gurevich MiG-25R, and 3 to 5 Yakovlev Yak-28R, the latter of which was being phased out.

History
In World War II, the German Luftwaffe occupied the local area and maintained two airfields: "Shatalovka-East" which was later abandoned and returned to farmland, and "Shatalovka-West" which became the modern air base.

The 32nd Guards Fighter Aviation Regiment was stationed at the base from 1968 until it disbanded on 30 June 1989. It was part of the 9th Fighter Aviation Division headquartered at Kubinka.

Shatalovo was home to 164th ORAP (164th Independent Reconnaissance Aviation Regiment) flying Mikoyan-Gurevich MiG-25 and Sukhoi Su-24 aircraft and 47 Gv ORAP (47th Guards Independent Reconnaissance Aviation Regiment) flying MiG-25RB aircraft. The 164th Guards ORAP arrived from Poland in 1992, and disbanded in 1997. It was also used by 1046th TsBP i PLS (1046th Aircrew Combat Training and Retraining Centre) flying 17 MiG-25, 14 Sukhoi Su-17C, and 13 Su-24 aircraft in 1991.

The base is home to the 4th Independent Reconnaissance Aviation Squadron equipped with Sukhoi Su-24MR (NATO: Fencer-E) and Antonov An-30 (ASCC: Clank).

References

Soviet Long Range Aviation bases
Soviet Frontal Aviation
Russian Air Force bases
Airports in Smolensk Oblast